Vrhe is a settlement in the City Municipality of Celje in eastern Slovenia. It lies in the eastern outskirts of Celje to the east of Teharje. The area is part of the traditional region of Styria.  It is now included with the rest of the municipality in the Savinja Statistical Region.

Church
The local church is dedicated to Saint Anne and belongs to the Parish of Teharje. It dates to the mid-15th century.

Mass grave
Vrhe is the site of a mass grave from the period immediately after the Second World War. It is part of the 25 mass graves in the Celje area. It contains the remains of German and Slovene prisoners that died at the Teharje camp.

References

External links
Vrhe on Geopedia

Populated places in the City Municipality of Celje